Anaglyph (Greek ana+gluphein - "to carve") may refer to:
 Anaglyph 3D, a method of encoding a three-dimensional image in a single picture by superimposing a pair of pictures
 Ornament (art) carved in low relief

See also 
 Glyph (disambiguation)